The 2021 Senedd election took place on Thursday 6 May 2021 to elect 60 members to the Senedd (Welsh Parliament). It was the sixth devolved general election since the Senedd (formerly the National Assembly for Wales) was established in 1999. The election was held alongside the Scottish Parliament election, English local elections, London Assembly and mayoral election and the Hartlepool by-election.

It was the first election in which 16- and 17-year-olds and legally resident foreign nationals were allowed to vote in Wales, the largest extension of the franchise in Wales since 1969. Both changes were a result of the Senedd and Elections (Wales) Act 2020. It was also the first election for the legislature under its new name – 'Senedd Cymru' or 'the Welsh Parliament' – and thus this election may be called the 2021 Welsh Parliament election, or 2021 Senedd Cymru election, in preference over the shorter name.

Five parties had Members of the Senedd (MSs, formerly Assembly Members – AMs) elected at the previous election: Welsh Labour, the Welsh Conservatives, Plaid Cymru, the UK Independence Party (UKIP), and the Welsh Liberal Democrats. Seven political parties were represented in the Senedd prior to the election. These are the five aforementioned parties and two parties that gained MSs who were elected for – and moved from – other political parties. The Abolish the Welsh Assembly Party gained two MSs who were elected for UKIP in 2016, and Propel (previously the Welsh Nation Party) gained an MS elected for Plaid Cymru in 2016.

The governing Labour Party's share of the constituency vote increased by over 5%, and the regional vote by over 4%, with thirty Labour MSs elected accounting for exactly half of the sixty seats, one more than in 2016 but one short of an overall majority and remaining as the largest party. The Conservatives became the Senedd's second-largest party and the official opposition to the Welsh Government with sixteen MSs elected, five more than their 2016 result. This result is the best that the Conservatives managed to achieve since the Senedd was established. Plaid Cymru slipped down to third place with thirteen MSs elected, one more than in 2016. Coalition partner, the Liberal Democrats lost their single constituency seat from 2016, but gained a regional list seat, keeping their total of one seat, the same as in 2016. UKIP received no seats, down from their seven in the 2016 election. This included seats later transferred to Abolish the Welsh Assembly, who also received no seats.

Voter turnout was 46.6%, a record for a Senedd election.

Electoral system

In elections for the Senedd, using the additional member system, each voter has two votes. The first vote is for a member for the voter's constituency, elected by the first past the post system. The second vote is for a regional closed party list of candidates. Additional member seats are allocated from the lists by the D'Hondt method, with constituency results being taken into account in the allocation. In this election the system achieved a broadly proportional result in the North Wales and Mid and West Wales electoral regions. However, as in previous elections, the large number of constituency seats won by the Labour Party in the South Wales West, South Wales Central and South Wales East electoral regions, when set against the small proportion of available additional regional seats, means that the Labour Party is over-represented by a margin of four seats, when considered on a proportional basis.

Under the Wales Act 2014, a candidate is allowed to stand in both a constituency and a regional list. However, holding a dual mandate with the House of Commons is illegal, meaning a Member of the Senedd cannot also be an MP.

This was the first election where 16- and 17-year olds could vote, following the enactment of Senedd and Elections (Wales) Act in January 2020.

The registration deadline for voters in this election was 11:59 pm, 19 April 2021.

Background
The 2019 European Parliament election in the United Kingdom was the last of its kind. The newly formed Brexit Party came out on top in Wales. Plaid Cymru, who support full Welsh independence, came second, marking the first time it had beaten Labour in a Wales-wide election. The Brexit Party also formed a parliamentary group in the Assembly made up of the four ex-UK Independence Party (UKIP) members, led by Mark Reckless. A snap general election in the United Kingdom was held on 12 December 2019. Welsh Labour suffered an 8% drop in their vote, losing all their seats in North Wales, except for Alyn and Deeside. Labour ended up losing six parliamentary seats to the Welsh Conservatives in Boris Johnson's landslide victory. These seats included Bridgend, which has been represented on the assembly level by former First Minister of Wales Carwyn Jones since the 1999 election. The Conservatives also picked up Brecon and Radnorshire from the Welsh Liberal Democrats.

On 31 January 2020, the United Kingdom left the European Union. This followed a referendum on the matter in which Wales narrowly voted to leave the EU. South Wales has been highlighted by many as evidence that Brexit cut across traditional party allegiances, as the area typically votes overwhelmingly for Labour. The band of eight local authorities covering the Valleys area from Swansea in the west to Torfaen in the east, plus the coastal city of Newport, all voted in favour of Brexit, and all are represented in the House of Commons by Labour MPs, all of whom wished to remain in the EU.

Plaid Cymru campaigned for a Remain vote in the 2016 referendum on the UK's membership of the EU. Plaid Cymru later supported, during the final stages of Brexit process, a second referendum on the matter. Plaid argued that there should be a referendum on Welsh independence after Brexit, so that Wales could apply for EU membership. A June 2020 YouGov/ITV Cymru poll concluded that 25% were in favour of independence and 54% opposed. The same poll found that 22% of respondents wanted no devolution in Wales, and that 25% were for abolition of the Senedd, with 48% opposed to abolition. A follow-up YouGov poll in August 2020 concluded that support for Welsh independence had risen to 32%.

On 17 May 2020, Health Minister Vaughan Gething told ITV Wales it was "possible" that the election might not be allowed to happen, because of the uncertainty of the COVID-19 pandemic. The First Minister Mark Drakeford announced on 29 June 2020 that a group with representatives from all of the main parties would look at the arrangements that might have to be in place for the election if COVID-19 restrictions are still required. It would look at campaigning and voting, gathering "views over the summer so that by September, any changes the group feels would be beneficial can be considered and taken forward". There was no consensus to agree if a delay was needed, but all parties agreed on measures to encourage vulnerable voters and others to consider applying for a postal vote and early applications, greater flexibility around the nomination of candidates, postal and proxy voting, and measures to ensure the safe operation of polling stations and count venues. The Wales Electoral Coordination Board said on 5 January 2021 that counting of Senedd election votes cannot be done overnight because of COVID restrictions. The board said that the count "will require more staff and take longer to perform."

The Welsh Government introduced a bill under emergency legislation, Welsh Elections (Coronavirus) Bill, in January 2021. It gives the Llywydd (presiding officer) the power to delay the election (with the recommendation of date by the First Minister and consent of two-thirds of the Senedd) by up to six months if the Coronavirus pandemic would make the elections unsafe. The bill was passed on the 10 February 2021 with powers also to introduce early voting and more flexibility with proxy voting.

On 9 March 2021 in a joint British Governments statement ministers said that there will be safety measures in place for May's elections. They encouraged voters to take their own pens or pencils and reconfirmed their aim for elections being conducted on the 6 May 2021.  In the 3-week review on the 12 March 2021 the First Minister said that the threshold for postponing the election hasn't currently been met. Drakeford also said that leafleting (not door knocking) will be able to start from 15 March.

During the pandemic, the Welsh government messaging and laws have been distinct from the UK government's actions in England; this has made the Welsh public more conscious about devolution. The Welsh government only allowed businesses access to the Economic Resilience Fund devolved to them by Westminster if they officially recognised a trade union which could recruit in their workplaces. The Welsh government announced a two-week lockdown to reduce the prevalence of the virus – called a "firebreak" – in line with the other devolved administrations and distinct from the UK government's lockdown in England.

On 11 December 2020, Plaid Cymru announced that they would hold a referendum on Welsh independence within five years if they won a majority. Some observers also believed they would have requested a Welsh independence referendum in exchange for supporting a minority government.  Despite being a unionist party, Labour selected three candidates who supported independence.

On 3 February 2021, UKIP leader Neil Hamilton stated that the party would pledge to deliver a referendum on the devolved administrations in Wales, Scotland and Northern Ireland. He later told BBC Radio Wales: "UKIP had its founding principle in getting out of the European Union and now we've done that we can concentrate on reintegrating the United Kingdom... Our slogan in this election is 'scrap the Senedd'."

On 7 March 2021, the Abolish the Welsh Assembly Party announced that it would be running candidates in all constituencies in the election, and also said that it would run candidates on the regional list. On 6 April, BBC News reported that Gareth Bennett would not stand for Abolish, with Bennett coming to a mutual agreement with the party to stand as an independent in Cynon Valley whilst still remaining supportive of the party, a decision which left Mark Reckless as the party's only MS. The same day, it was reported that ten prospective candidates for Abolish had also "dropped out" with leader Richard Suchorzewski claiming it was due to, "Welsh Nationalist abuse and fear of reprisals."

On 16 April, it was reported that of the 70,000 16 and 17-year-olds eligible to vote, less than 9,000 were currently registered in six counties, according to figures collected by the Election Reform Society (ERS). The deadline to register to vote was Monday 19 April 2021. Figures later compiled by the BBC suggested around 46% of eligible people in this age group were registered to vote by the deadline.

Retiring members
The following MSs did not run for re-election:

Parties

Contesting constituency and regional ballots 
Labour, Plaid Cymru, Conservatives, Liberal Democrats and Reform UK stood in all 40 constituencies and all five regional ballots. Five other parties contested all five regions and at least one constituency: Abolish the Welsh Assembly (23 constituencies), UKIP (14 constituencies), Gwlad (14 constituencies), Welsh Green Party (13 constituencies) and Propel (11 constituencies). Llais Gwynedd and Socialist Party of Great Britain stood in Dwyfor Meirionnydd and Cardiff Central respectively. Neither party stood in any regional races. Two parties contested some of the regions and at least one constituency: Freedom Alliance (3 regions and 13 constituencies) and No More Lockdowns (2 regions and 1 constituency).

Parties with representation in the Senedd prior to the election 

The five remaining seats were occupied by those independent of political parties.

Other parties contesting all or some regions and all or some constituencies

Contesting regional ballot only 
Some parties opted to only contest the regional lists. Two parties – Communist Party of Great Britain and TUSC – contested all five electoral regions. The Welsh Christian Party and the Workers Party of Britain both stood in only one region.

Campaign 
In the midst of the COVID-19 pandemic, campaigning took into account health issues. Restrictions were placed on the ability of campaigners to carry out door-to-door campaigning. Campaign rallies were not possible, which affected the impact of candidates who normally do well at these events.

Mark Drakeford was criticised for publishing a leaflet in the English language, without a bilingual one. Joel Williams, Conservative candidate for Cardiff North, got the name of his own constituency wrong on a campaign leaflet. Dwyfor Meirionydd Conservative candidate, Charlie Evans, had to apologise for a tweet praising Llyn Tryweryn, the lake which was created to provide water for Liverpool, immortalised with the slogan Cofiwch Dryweryn.

After the death of Prince Philip on 9 April 2021, all of the main political parties suspended campaigning as a mark of respect. Labour and Plaid Cymru restarted their campaigns three days later.

Election debates

Constituency nominations
NB: MSs in office (i.e. incumbents) before the election are bolded. Winners are highlighted with party colours.

Regional nominations 
NB: MSs in office (i.e. incumbents) before the election are bolded.

According the National Assembly for Wales (Representation of the People) Order 1999, "party lists" may include from one to twelve candidates. They are elected "in the order that they are included on that list (starting with the highest)".

The list below only shows the first ranks. Elected candidates are highlighted with party colours.

Opinion polling 

The constituency vote is shown in lighter lines, while the regional vote is shown in darker lines.

Target seats
Below are listed all the constituencies which require a swing of less than 10% from the 2016 result to change hands.

Labour targets

Plaid Cymru targets

Conservative targets

Liberal Democrat targets

Results

Overall

Constituency and regional summary

Mid and West Wales 

|-
! colspan="2" style="width: 150px"|Party
! Elected candidates
! style="width: 40px"|Seats
! style="width: 40px"|+/−
! style="width: 50px"|Votes
! style="width: 40px"|%
! style="width: 40px"|+/−%
|-

North Wales 

|-
! colspan="2" style="width: 150px"|Party
! Elected candidates
! style="width: 40px"|Seats
! style="width: 40px"|+/−
! style="width: 50px"|Votes
! style="width: 40px"|%
! style="width: 40px"|+/−%
|-

South Wales Central 

|-
! colspan="2" style="width: 150px"|Party
! Elected candidates
! style="width: 40px"|Seats
! style="width: 40px"|+/−
! style="width: 50px"|Votes
! style="width: 40px"|%
! style="width: 40px"|+/−%
|-

South Wales East 

|-
! colspan="2" style="width: 150px"|Party
! Elected candidates
! style="width: 40px"|Seats
! style="width: 40px"|+/−
! style="width: 50px"|Votes
! style="width: 40px"|%
! style="width: 40px"|+/−%
|-

South Wales West 

|-
! colspan="2" style="width: 150px"|Party
! Elected candidates
! style="width: 40px"|Seats
! style="width: 40px"|+/−
! style="width: 50px"|Votes
! style="width: 40px"|%
! style="width: 40px"|+/−%
|-

Turnout
This election saw the highest ever turnout for a Senedd election, with 46.6% of eligible Welsh voters casting their ballot. The previous high was 46.3% in 1999. There were, however, also noticeable differences in turnout in certain constituencies, with 52% of registered voters voting in Dwyfor Meirionnydd and just 35% doing so in Merthyr Tydfil and Rhymney.

Dr Jac Larner, a politics lecturer at Cardiff University and an investigator for the Welsh election survey, said that the two largest factors in determining voter turnout between constituencies were their socio-economic make-up and the competitiveness of the seat. "Basically, people with higher levels of formal education, people who own houses, people with more wealth essentially, are more likely to turn up to vote," he told BBC News. "Straight away, as you compare Cardiff North to Merthyr Tydfil, you see big differences there. However, we also know there's a pretty strong relationship between how competitive a constituency is and turnout. That's not just in Wales, that's a general rule almost everywhere in the world - and Merthyr Tydfil, as we've seen in this election, is not competitive in any sense."

Writing in Tribune magazine, Labour MS Mick Antoniw said that Welsh Labour's victory was "linked to the successful way in which Mark Drakeford and his government have handled the Covid pandemic and the way he has stood up to the more bizarre and reckless decisions of Boris Johnson, always putting the safety of the Welsh people and Welsh interests first."

Donations

See also 
Other elections in the UK which were held on the same day:
 2021 London Assembly election
 2021 London mayoral election
 2021 Scottish Parliament election
 2021 United Kingdom local elections

Notes

References

External links
 Senedd Election 2021
 Why do Welsh Labour keep winning in Wales? UKinEU

Wales
Senedd election
2020s elections in Wales
General elections to the Senedd